Thomas Grady (born March 18, 1985) is an American football quarterback who primarily played in the Arena Football League (AFL). 

After a standout high school career at Edison High School,  Grady signed with the University of Oklahoma to continue his football career. After a lack of playing time for two years, Grady transferred to the University of Utah. While at Utah, Grady saw limited action again, making only three starts in his career. 

After being passed on in the 2008 NFL Draft, Grady signed with the Oklahoma City Yard Dawgs of af2 in 2009. When the Yard Dawgs transitioned into the Arena Football League, Grady was re-signed and led the Yard Dawgs to a 6–10 record. In 2011, Grady signed with the Utah Blaze, where he threw for 107 touchdowns while leading the Blaze to a 9–9 record, just missing the playoffs. After re-signing for the 2012 season, Grady posted the greatest single season for a quarterback in AFL history. He set single season records for touchdown passes (142) and passing yards (5,863), while also tying a single-game record with 12 touchdown passes against the Cleveland Gladiators. He re-signed with the Blaze in 2013 to a three-year maximum contract.

Early life

On July 8, 2003, Grady committed to Oklahoma. Grady chose Oklahoma over offers from Florida State, Tennessee, UCLA, USC and Washington.

College career

Oklahoma
Grady began his college career at the University of Oklahoma, He redshirted in 2003, and watched from the sidelines as starter Jason White won the Heisman Trophy. As White's backup in 2004, Grady completed 12 of 14 passes for 63 yards and one touchdown.

Utah
Grady transferred to the University of Utah in 2005. He saw limited action as a junior in 2006, completing 7 of 14 passes for 102 yards, one touchdown, and one interception.  He entered his senior season as a backup, but took over as quarterback when starter Brian Johnson suffered an injury early in the year. Grady played in nine games, including six starts (4-2 record).  He finished the season with 58 completions in 115 attempts, for a total of 681 yards, with four touchdowns and three interceptions.  The highlight of the year for Grady was leading the Utes to a 44–6 rout over #11 ranked UCLA.

College career statistics

Professional career
Grady was rated the 35th best quarterback in the 2008 NFL Draft by NFLDraftScout.com.

Oklahoma City Yard Dawgz
In 2009, after training camp with the Miami Dolphins, Grady played for the Oklahoma City Yard Dawgz of af2. In 2010, Grady was re-signed by the Yard Dawgz. He was the starter for the Yard Dawgz in its only season in Arena Football League. He led the team to a 6–10 record.

Utah Blaze
In 2011, Grady signed with the Utah Blaze. In the 2011 season, he led the Blaze to a 9–9 record, and threw for over 100 touchdowns.

He re-signed with the Blaze for the 2012 season. Grady led the Blaze to a 12–6 record, with a playoff berth. During the season, Grady set a single-season record for touchdown passes with 142, breaking the previous mark of 117 set by Chris Greisen. Grady's play during the season landed him the Arena Football League Offensive Player of the Year Award. Grady also broke Greisen's record of passing yards in a single season, with 5,870. During a July 13 game against the Cleveland Gladiators, Grady threw 12 touchdown passes, tying an AFL single-game record.

Grady re-signed with the Blaze on November 1, 2012 to a three-year maximum.

Pittsburgh Power
Grady was assigned to the Pittsburgh Power on September 6, 2013 after he was selected in the dispersal draft of the Chicago Rush and Blaze players. The Power folded after the 2014 season.

Jacksonville Sharks
On January 20, 2015, Grady was assigned to the Jacksonville Sharks.

On October 14, 2016, Grady was assigned to the Washington Valor during the dispersal draft after Jacksonville chose to leave the Arena Football League. However, on November 29, 2016, Grady elected to remain with the Sharks in the newly-created National Arena League for the 2017 season. He suffered a season-ending foot injury on April 24, 2017, against the Monterrey Steel. Grady played in five games for the Sharks in 2017, completing 71 of 113 passes for 1,060 yards, 23 touchdowns, and 1 interception. On August 14, 2017, Grady signed with the Sharks for the 2018 season, but left the team during the preseason.

Albany Empire
On April 2, 2018, Grady returned to the AFL with the expansion Albany Empire.  He led the team to the best regular season record and was named the All-Arena team, but lost in the semifinals to two-win Washington Valor. He stayed with the Empire for the 2019 season and defeated the Philadelphia Soul in ArenaBowl XXXII, giving Grady his first Arena Bowl championship. Grady won the Most Valuable Player Award in 2018 and 2019. The AFL folded after the 2019 season.

Grady returned to Albany when a new version of the Empire joined the National Arena League (NAL) in 2021. In the 2021 season, Grady made the All-NAL Second Team, as well as leading the team to the 2021 championship. Following the season, he claimed the new organization had not paid his championship bonus, that the experience off-field was the worst of his career, and considered himself retired. He was subsequently suspended indefinitely by the league because of his public statements about the team, which the league claimed to be false.

AFL statistics

Stats from ArenaFan:

NAL statistics

References

External links
 Utah bio
 Utah Blaze bio

1985 births
Living people
American football quarterbacks
Utah Utes football players
Pittsburgh Power players
Utah Blaze players
Oklahoma City Yard Dawgz players
Sportspeople from Huntington Beach, California
Players of American football from California
Oklahoma Sooners football players
Jacksonville Sharks players
Washington Valor players
Albany Empire (AFL) players